Marcello Cuttitta (born 2 September 1966) is a former Italian rugby union player who went into coaching after retirement.
His role was wing.

Cuttitta played club rugby for major Italian teams including L'Aquila from 1985 to 1988, Amatori Milan from 1988 to 1997, and Calvisano from 1997 to 2000; since retirement, he has been Amatori Milan's head coach since 2003.

He attended Pinetown Boys High School with his brother, and they both played for Pinetown 1st XV.

He played for the Italian national team at the first Rugby World Cup in 1987 as well as representing them at the subsequent World Cups in 1991 and 1995. Marcello Cuttitta is the Italian National team's top try scorer (26).

In total, Cuttitta played for Italy 55 times. He usually played on the wing. He often played (both in club and National team) alongside his twin brother Massimo.

External links
RBS 6 Nations profile
Scrum.com bio

1966 births
Italian rugby union coaches
Italian rugby union players
Living people
Rugby union wings
Italy international rugby union players
Amatori Rugby Milano players
Italian twins
Twin sportspeople